WSS, formerly known as Warehouse Shoe Sale, is a national retail chain of shoe stores headquartered in Los Angeles, California, with 92 retail outlets as of January 2020. Its parent company is Eurostar, Inc.

The company now known as WSS traces its roots to 1977 when Eric Alon first sold shoes at a swap meet. The first brick & mortar store opened in 1984 and as of 2018, Alon was still with the company in an executive and ownership role. WSS primarily serves the urban and Latino communities, which has been a large reason for their growth.  

In 2015 to celebrate their 30th anniversary, they opened a new flagship in Downtown LA.

As of August 2, 2021, Foot Locker purchased WSS for $750 million.

References

External links
WSS Official Website

Foot Locker
Shoe companies of the United States
American companies established in 1984
Retail companies established in 1984
2021 mergers and acquisitions
Footwear retailers of the United States
Companies based in Los Angeles
1984 establishments in California